Royal Leopards Football Club are a Eswatini soccer club based in Simunye. They are the Royal Eswatini Police team.

Achievements
Swazi Premier League: 8
 2006, 2007, 2008, 2014, 2015, 2016, 2020-21, 2021-22.

Swazi Cup: 3
 2007, 2011, 2014.

Swazi Charity Cup: 4
 2006, 2013, 2015, 2016.

Swazi Trade Fair Cup: 1
 2004.

Current squad

Performance in CAF competitions
CAF Champions League: 4 appearances
2007 – Preliminary Round
2008 – Preliminary Round
2009 – Preliminary Round
2022 - Second Round

CAF Confederation Cup: 3 appearances
2012 – Second Round
2015 - Second Round
2022 - Group Stage

CAF Cup: 1 appearance
1999 – First Round

References

External links
Team profile - Soccerway.com

 
Football clubs in Eswatini
Association football clubs established in 1979
1979 establishments in Swaziland